is a Japanese former water polo player who competed in the 1968 Summer Olympics.

References

1941 births
Living people
Japanese male water polo players
Olympic water polo players of Japan
Water polo players at the 1968 Summer Olympics
20th-century Japanese people
21st-century Japanese people